For many decades, the New York metropolitan area has suffered from an increasing shortage of housing. As a result, New York City has the second-highest rents of any city in the United States.

Shortage has long been usual. World War I and World War II left housing shortages that persisted in peacetime. Decades later, according to the Plan for New York City of 1969, "It is obvious that a great deal is wrong. The air is polluted. The streets are dirty and choked. The subways are jammed. The waters of the rivers and bays are fouled. There is a severe shortage of housing."

Since the middle 1990s construction has greatly increased in the city. Between 2009 and 2018, according to the New York City Comptroller, New York gained 500,000 new residents, but built only 100,000 new housing units. Mayor Bill de Blasio has described the affordability of housing as "the biggest crisis facing our city".

Supply factors 
In the post-war era, New York, like most American cities, saw a sharp decline in population as “white flight,” highway construction, and old commuter railroads allowed families to decamp from cities into new suburbs outside the city limits. Consequently, from approximately 1950 to 2000, New York City’s total population sat below its previous all-time high. This exodus from the city allowed rents to remain relatively affordable through the immediate post-war era.

However, In the late 20th century cultural changes increased demand for city life as individuals and families became increasingly likely to remain in cities, or at least delay moves to the suburbs.  Jobs returned to downtown centers and demand for housing in New York boomed.

To absorb this demand, New York produced 2.2 units per job from 2001 to 2008. However, from 2009 to 2018 the City built just 0.5 units per job as land use regulation, historical preservation, and political opposition ground housing production to a halt.

Consequently, the cost of housing production has skyrocketed in New York. With little available land remaining for development, long approvals processes, and onerous building code provisions, costs to produce housing have markedly increased at every step of the process. As a result, developers are unable to provide moderately-priced housing as the costs imposed by the City and local opposition forces have made housing for the middle class prohibitively expensive to build. In addition to development restrictions, there are barriers which inhibit repartitioning existing units to accommodate more people. New York City housing codes restrict the number of people who are legally allowed to occupy a unit, as well as the number of bedrooms within a unit.

Moreover, New York’s public housing stock, a vital tool for reducing homelessness and maintaining the number of affordable units, has fallen into disrepair as government management failed the City’s low-income residents.

With production costs and zoning laws limiting private production of housing, and incompetence and criminal mismanagement reducing the efficacy of public housing, New York is facing a chronic housing shortage that increases costs for all New Yorkers looking to rent or buy a new home. Groups like the Citizens Housing and Planning Council and Open New York advocate for a resolution of the housing shortage through zoning reforms that would increase the rate of housing production.

Demand factors 
Between 2000 and 2012, the median rent of an apartment increased 75 percent in New York City compared to 44 percent for the rest of the United States. The increase impacted the poor and working class most. There was a loss of 400,000 apartments renting for $1,000 a month or less (constant 2012 dollars) and a resulting gain of apartments renting over this. This was not a small shift but saw 240,000 units renting for $601–800 disappear and apartments renting for $1,201-1,600 having the highest gains. Median rent in constant dollars increased from $839 in 2000 to $1,100 in 2012.

Partially offsetting the growth in housing units was an increase in population to 8.6 million people. All boroughs, including the Bronx, are close to all-time population highs as of 2018. Factors include an increase in employment to 4.5 million jobs and a trend of decreasing crime.

Impact of affordable housing shortage

Overcrowding 
Almost 1.5 million people live in overcrowded conditions in New York City. Overall crowding rose from 7.6 percent in 2005 to 8.8 percent in 2013 (a 15.8 percent increase). Overcrowding is not limited to low-income households, but is found at all income levels.

The California Health and Human Services Agency defines "severe overcrowding" as more than 1.5 persons per room. The severe overcrowding rate in the nation is 0.99 percent and is 3.33 percent in New York City.

Homelessness 

In 2018 there were 63,495 homeless in New York City, including over 23,600 children. Total homelessness in the city had increased by 82 percent over the last decade. According to an agency funded by the New York State Education Department, there were 104,088 students (1 in 10) living in temporary shelters and identified as homeless in the city's school system for the period 2016-2017.

Homelessness is expensive for the city.  Following a 1981 consent decree arising from Callahan v. Carey, the city is required by law to provide shelter to any eligible person who asks for it.  To shelter one family in one of the 167 family shelters costs $34,573 a year. $1.04 billion was budgeted for 2014 to provide homeless services, up from $535.8 million in 2002.

Government initiatives 
The city has had many periods of housing shortages in its history. Following a housing crisis in the 1920s, 700,000 units were built but in the 1930s people were again talking about a crisis. Mayors Fiorello H. La Guardia and William O'Dwyer dealt with slum clearance and building public housing. Rent control in New York, having begun as part of price controls on the United States home front during World War II, continued after the war. Robert F. Wagner Jr. and John Lindsay oversaw the Mitchell-Lama Housing Program. Ed Koch was mayor during a wave of housing abandonment which had to be addressed. This continued under David Dinkins and Rudy Giuliani.

Homelessness of individuals and families became a major issue during the 1980s and 1990s. Mayor Bloomberg's term in office saw an economically resurgent city. During this period, rents in New York City rose more than 15 percent over the increase in the country as a whole. His New Housing Marketplace Plan pledged to create 165,000 units of affordable housing between 2002-2014, of which 53,000 would be new units and 112,000 preserved units. The cost for this program was $23.6 billion, of which $5.3 billion was public funds leveraging $18.3 billion in private funds.

In 2016, Mayor Bill de Blasio promised an even more aggressive plan to build and preserve 200,000 housing units over ten-years and he introduced mandatory-inclusionary zoning requiring 30 percent of all new construction units to be affordable.  The goals of the initiative, which was called Housing New York, were later increased to 300,000 affordable housing units by 2026.  By the end of his administration, in 2021, none of the goals of the program had been reached: although Mr. de Blasio claimed that he had succeeded in "fighting inequality".

See also 
 421-a tax exemption, which promotes affordable housing in New York City by giving tax breaks to real-estate developers for building new multi-family residential housing buildings
 OneNYC, the official strategic plan for development of NYC
 San Francisco housing shortage
 California housing shortage
 Rent regulation in New York

References

Further reading 
 Barker, Kim (May 30, 2018) "Behind New York’s Housing Crisis: Weakened Laws and Fragmented Regulation" The New York Times
 NYC For All: The Housing We Need (November 2018) Office of the New York City Comptroller, Scott M. Stringer
 2018 Housing Supply Report New York City Rent Guidelines Board

Affordable housing
Economic inequality in the United States
Economy of New York City
Politics of New York City
Housing in New York City